Robert Lynn Pruett (September 18, 1979 – October 12, 2017) was a Texas man convicted and executed for the 1999 murder of TDCJ Correctional Officer Daniel Nagle (September 9, 1962 – December 17, 1999) at the McConnell Unit, Bee County. Pruett had been certified as an adult at 16 and was already serving a 99-year sentence for his involvement in the murder of Ray Yarborough (January 4, 1967 – August 9, 1995), which occurred when Pruett was 15. Pruett was convicted along with Howard Steven "Sam" Pruett Sr. (born December 13, 1946, age ), his father, who received a life sentence for his participation in the murder, and Howard Steven Pruett Jr. (born November 22, 1969, age ), his brother, who received a 40-year sentence. Howard Sr. testified that neither son took part in the killing, as did Robert, who was nonetheless convicted under the Texas law of parties. Details of both the Yarborough and Nagle murders were featured in the BBC documentary Life and Death Row - Crisis Stage.

Pruett also consistently denied involvement in Nagle's murder and his defense attorney stated that "what convicted him was the testimony of four or five convicts who received deals, of one kind or another, in exchange for the testimony against Pruett". The state relied on the testimony of Lisa Baylor, a forensic analyst who testified, using a now-debunked scientific method called "physical matching".

Pruett died by lethal injection on October 12, 2017, after appeals for clemency to the Texas Board of Pardons and Paroles were rejected. Pruett started chanting during the execution and was visibly scared. Pruett was represented by the Texas Innocence Network and his attorneys pursued his innocence claim by appealing the denial of his DNA relief through the courts.

While in the Texas death row at the Polunsky Unit near Livingston, Pruett received 4 stays of execution. His previous execution dates were May 21, 2013, May 21, 2014, April 28, 2015, April 27, 2016 (rescheduled to August 23, 2016 without comment, then stayed).

Conviction
A Nueces County jury found Pruett guilty of capital murder on April 24, 2002. The only witnesses to Nagle's murder were inmates. Nagle, who was the president of the AFSCME union local that represents McConnell guards, had complained that low pay, high turnover, and poor training of staff were turning Texas prisons into powderkegs. Nagle told supporters at the rally at the Governor's Mansion that "someone would have to be killed" before TDCJ got the message. He was murdered two weeks later. Some Correctional Officers stated that corrupt C.O.s, known colloquially as "dirty bosses", were in league with prison gangs, and that they and their gang associates inside were involved with his murder.

There was no physical evidence linking Pruett with the murder, which he claims he did not witness or participate in. When the murder weapon was tested for DNA, nothing conclusive was found.
Nagle was killed as a result of a stabbing with a prison shank. Weeks after the stabbing, Correctional Officers at the McConnell Unit were indicted for colluding with inmates to traffic drugs.

Eliseo Martinez, one of the Correctional Officers interviewed during the investigation into Nagle's death, was arrested in late January 2000 for transporting a package believed to have contained $60,000 in laundered drug profits for inmates. Martinez claimed Pruett had told him he possessed a homemade shank during the investigation.

In 2014, Pruett's post-conviction writ of habeas corpus was denied, with Judges Alcala and Johnson dissenting.

In April 2017, Pruett's appeal was dismissed by the Court of Appeals for the 5th Circuit. The ruling that stated that the inconclusive DNA results wouldn't have had any effect on the jury's verdict had they been available during his 2002 trial. Pruett claims that the foreman of the jury that sentenced him to death asked him for forgiveness due to doubts about the safety of his conviction. As a result, Pruett's final death warrant was signed on June 26, 2017.

Judge Elsa Alcala wrote in a concurring opinion that "it appears there may be significant problems with the evidence of guilt and with the imposition of the death penalty in this case", and that the "Court should permit further litigation on appellant's post-conviction challenges in which he has sought to undermine the validity of his guilt and death sentence".

Pruett had written for inmate blog "Minutes Before Six".

See also
 List of people executed in Texas, 2010–2019
 List of people executed in the United States in 2017

References

External links
 Faces of Death Row: The Texas Tribune
 Texas Execution Information Center
 How a death row inmate who’s been in prison since he was 15 finds meaning in daily life
 Scheduled Execution Revives Debate Over Prison Staffing
 Texas Cracks Down on the Market for Jailhouse Snitches
 Friday Documentary - Dead Man Walking
 The Autobiography of Robert Pruett

1979 births
1995 murders in the United States
1999 murders in the United States
2017 deaths
American male criminals
American people convicted of murder
21st-century executions by Texas
21st-century executions of American people
People convicted of murder by Texas
People executed by Texas by lethal injection
People executed for murder